The Mt. McSauba Site, also designated 20CX23, is an archaeological site located near Charlevoix, Michigan. It was listed on the National Register of Historic Places in 1976. The site is an encampment on a dune.

Gallery

References

National Register of Historic Places in Charlevoix County, Michigan
Archaeological sites on the National Register of Historic Places in Michigan